Bernard Bonnin (September 8, 1938 – November 21, 2009) was a Spanish Filipino actor.

Early life
He was born on September 8, 1938, to parents Juan S. Bonnin, a pure Spaniard from Palma de Mallorca, and Lina Zayco, a native of Himamaylan, Negros Occidental. He moved to Manila at the age of 14 to complete his secondary education in San Beda.

Career
He rose to fame with the 1965 movie, Palos. In 2008, ABS-CBN remade Palos into a teleserye starring Jake Cuenca, with Bonnin returning in a supporting role. Bonnin appeared in over 100 films, including Gagamba, Ako ang Lalagot sa Hininga Mo, Code Name: Bomba, Target: Captain Karate. His first film was Ay Pepita.

In This Action Movie Villain Role of Ako ang Tatapos sa Araw mo (1989), Ibabaon Kita sa Lupa (1990), Dudurugin Kita ng Bala ko (1992), Nandito Ako (1994), and Duwelo (1996).

Filmography

Film
Walang Takot (1958)
Anak ni Waray (1958)
Kung Ako'y Mahal Mo - Virgilio (1960)
Sandata at Pangako (1961)
Alyas Palos - Palos (1961)
Kambal Na Baril (1962)
Jam Session - Dondoy (1962) 
Bakas ng Gagamba - Gagamba (1962)
Dapit-Hapon: Oras ng Pagtutuos (1963)
Kilabot Maghiganti (1963)
Palos Kontra Gagamba (1963)
Carioca (1963)
Ang Mga Lawin (1963)
Dakpin si Pedro Navarro! (1963)
Ikaw Ako Ngayon Bukas (1963)
Ang Lihim ni Gagamba (1964)
3 Musketeras (1964)
Walang Duwag Na Bisaya (1965)
Sandalyas ni Zafira (1965)
Oro Blanco (1965)
Doble 45 (1965)
Tagisan ng Mga Agimat (1965)
Batas ng .45 (1965)
Lambat - Agent 707 (1965)
La Sombra (1965)
Pedrong Hunyango (1965)
Karate sa Karate (1965)
Doble Talim (1965)
Wanted: Johnny L (1966)
Palos: Counterspy (1966) - Palos
Philcag in Vietnam (1967)
Target Captain Karate (1968)
Palos Strikes Again (1968)
Bart Salamanca (1968)
Gagamba at si Scorpio (1969) - Gagamba
The Arizona Kid (1970)
Women in Cages (1971) - Acosta
Tatlong Patak ng Dugo ni Adan (1980)
Alyas Palos II (1982) - Palos
Buy One, Take One (1988)
Ako ang Tatapos sa Araw Mo! (1989) - Martin
Ibabaon Kita sa Lupa (1990) - Mayor Roman Romualdez
Apoy sa Lupang Hinirang (1990)
Hanggang Kailan Kita Papatay (1990) - Garrido Iglesia
Alyas Pogi: Birador ng Nueva Ecija (1990) - Don Pepe
Alyas Pogi 2 (1992) - Don Pepe
Alyas Hunyango (1992) - Acosta
Dudurugin Kita ng Bala Ko (1992) - Victor Riduque
Big Boy Bato: Kilabot ng Kankaloo (1992) - Big Daddy
Nandito Ako (1994) - Don Rodrigo Braganza
Ikaw Pa ... Eh Love Kita (1995) - Major Morales
Seth Corteza (1996)
Duwelo (1996) - Eduardo Roldan
Alamid: Ang Alamat (1998)
Code Name: Bomba (1998) - Congressman Bambino
Moises Archangel 2: Tapusin Natin ang Labanan (1998)
Ako ang Lalagot sa Hininga Mo (1999)
Masikip sa Dibdib (2004)

Television
Palos - Vittorio Canavaro aka Ninong (2008; ABS-CBN)

Death
Bonnin died at the age of 71 on November 21, 2009 at the Philippine Heart Center in Quezon City following multiple organ failure due to diabetes. He is buried at the Heritage Memorial Park in Taguig.

References

1939 births
2009 deaths
Deaths from diabetes
Male actors from Negros Occidental
Filipino people of Spanish descent
Filipino television personalities
Hiligaynon people
Burials at The Heritage Park
Filipino male film actors